This article shows the rosters of all participating teams at the Men's U23 World Championship 2017 in Cairo, Egypt.

Pool A

Brazil

The following is the Brazilian roster in the 2017 FIVB Men's U23 World Championship.

Head coach: Giovane Gavio

Cuba

The following is the Cuban roster in the 2017 FIVB Men's U23 World Championship.

Head coach: Nicolas Vives

Egypt

The following is the Egyptian roster in the 2017 FIVB Men's U23 World Championship.

Head coach: Marcos Pinheiro Miranda

Japan

The following is the Japanese roster in the 2017 FIVB Men's U23 World Championship.

Head coach: Fumitoshi Tokunaga

Mexico

The following is the Mexican roster in the 2017 FIVB Men's U23 World Championship.

Head coach: José Luis Martell

Poland

The following is the Polish roster in the 2017 FIVB Men's U23 World Championship.

Head coach: Dariusz Daszkiewicz

Pool B

Algeria

The following is the Algerian roster in the 2017 FIVB Men's U23 World Championship.

Head coach: Bouhalla Salim

Argentina

The following is the Argentine roster in the 2017 FIVB Men's U23 World Championship.

Head coach: Camilo Soto

China

The following is the Chinese roster in the 2017 FIVB Men's U23 World Championship.

Head coach: Ju Genyin

Iran

The following is the Iranian roster in the 2017 FIVB Men's U23 World Championship.

Head coach: Juan Manual Cichello

Russia

The following is the Russian roster in the 2017 FIVB Men's U23 World Championship.

Head coach: Andrey Voronkov

Turkey

The following is the Turkish roster in the 2017 FIVB Men's U23 World Championship.

Head coach: Ahmet Reşat Arığ

See also
2017 FIVB Volleyball Women's U23 World Championship squads

References

External links
Official website

FIVB Volleyball Men's U23 World Championship
FIVB Volleyball Men's U23 World Championship
FIVB Volleyball World Championship squads